Fort d'Aubervilliers is a station of the Paris Métro. It is named after the old Fort d'Aubervilliers, one of the 16 forts built between 1841 and 1845 as the first belt of defence at a cannonball's distance outside Paris' 19th century wall.

History
The station opened on 4 October 1979 following an extension from Porte de la Villette.

The station served as the temporary terminus of the line until the opening of the second stage of the extension, to La Courneuve - 8 May 1945, which opened in 1987.

In 2019, the station was used by 3,889,085 passengers, making it the 123th busiest of the Métro network out of 302 stations.

In 2020, the station was used by 2,328,764 passengers amidst the COVID-19 pandemic, making it the 98th busiest of the Métro network out of 305 stations.

As of 2021, preparatory work on line 15's station is scheduled to start later in the year till 2023 with construction scheduled to start in late 2024, with a planned opening in 2030 as part of line 15 east.

Passenger services

Access 
The station has 4 entrances on Avenue de la Division Leclerc and Avenue Jean Jaurès.

Station layout

Platforms 
Fort d'Aubervilliers has a standard configuration with 2 tracks surrounded by 2 side platforms. The name of the station is written in Parisine font on enamelled plates. The platforms are devoid of seats and advertisements.

Other connections 
The station is also served by lines 152, 173, 234, 248, 250, and 330 of the RATP bus network and by line 609 of the TRA bus network on Sundays and public holidays. At night, the station is served by the line N42 of the Noctilien bus network.

Gallery

References

Roland, Gérard (2003). Stations de métro. D’Abbesses à Wagram. Éditions Bonneton.

Paris Métro line 7
Paris Métro stations in Aubervilliers
Railway stations in France opened in 1979